Youtefa Bridge (previously Holtekamp Bridge) is a steel arch type bridge over Youtefa Bay, Jayapura, Papua, Indonesia that connects Holtekamp in Muara Tami District with Hamadi in Jayapura Selatan District. The bridge cut the distance and travel time from Jayapura city center to Muara Tami District as well as Skouw State Border Post at Indonesia–Papua New Guinea border.

History
The bridge construction was carried out by consortium of state-owned construction companies PT Pembangunan Perumahan Tbk, PT Hutama Karya (Persero), and PT Nindya Karya (Persero), with a total construction cost of IDR 1.87 trillion and support from the  Ministry of Public Works and Housing worth IDR 1.3 trillion. The main span assembly of the Youtefa Bridge was not carried out at the bridge site, but at PAL Indonesia shipyard in Surabaya, East Java. Its production in Surabaya aims to improve safety aspects, improve welding quality, and speed up the implementation time to 3 months. This is the first time where the arch bridge is made elsewhere and then brought to the location.

From Surabaya the bridge span, weighing 2000 tons and 112.5 m long, was sent by ship with a 3,200 kilometers journey in 19 days. Installation of the first span was carried out on February 21, 2018, while the second span was installed on March 15, 2018 with an installation time of approximately 6 hours. The bridge was inaugurated in 28 October 2019 by President Joko Widodo.

Records
The Indonesian World Records Museum gave 2 records for the Youtefa Bridge construction project, namely the record for the delivery of a complete steel frame bridge with the farthest distance, and the record for the installation of the longest intact steel frame bridge.

References

Bridges completed in 2019
Bridges in Indonesia
Buildings and structures in Papua (province)